is a city in Okinawa Prefecture, Japan. It includes Ishigaki island and the Senkaku Islands territory. The city is the political, cultural, and economic center of the Yaeyama Islands. New Ishigaki Airport serves the city. As of December 2012, the city has an estimated population of 48,816 and a population density of 213 persons per km2. The total area is 229.00 km2.

It is also the location of the Senkaku Islands (see below in the Geography section).

History

The current city of Ishigaki was founded in 1908 as Yaeyama Village, an amalgamation of the Ishigaki, Ōhama, and Miyara magiri. In 1914 it was renamed to Ishigaki Village, and grew to become Ishigaki Town in 1926. Ishigaki was elevated to city status on July 10, 1947.

Historical footnote: One of the first Frenchmen ever to visit Japan, Guillaume Courtet, came ashore at Ishigaki in 1636.

Geography
The city of Ishigaki covers the entirety of Ishigaki Island. The island is surrounded by coral reefs. The highest point on Ishigaki Island is Omotodake.

Economy
Ishigaki produces sugarcane and pineapples. Tourism is also an important part of the economy of the city.

Transportation
New Ishigaki Airport and Ishigaki Port serve the city.

Climate
Ishigaki has a tropical rainforest climate (Köppen climate classification Af) with frequent cyclones so not equatorial. "Summers" are hot and "winters" warm. Precipitation is abundant throughout the year; the rainiest months are August and September (due to tropical storm/typhoon) while the driest months are December and July.

Sights
The town of Ishigaki has various sights to offer.
 Gongen Do is a Shinto shrine close to the center of Ishigaki town which was founded in 1614. The shrine was destroyed during a flood in 1771. The present buildings date from 1787. The neighbouring building is Torin Ji, a buddhist temple which was founded in 1614 as well. It houses several statues dating from 1737 which possibly represent tutelary gods of Ishigaki Island.
 Close by is Miyaradunchi, a residential building dating from 1819. Its architecture with a hip roof consisting of red tiles is similar to samurai houses on mainland Japan, but there have never been samurai on the Yaeyama Islands.
 The Museum of the Yaeyama Islands, Shiritsu Yaeyama Hakubutsukan, is on Main Street in the center of Ishigaki town. Various kinds of boats and other items referring to the history and culture of the Yaeyama Islands can be seen. It is famous for being the southernmost museum of Japan.
 Fuzaki Kannon Do is a small Shinto shrine dating from 1742. The shrine is dedicated to Kannon.
 Kabira Bay

Notable people from Ishigaki 
 Yukiya Arashiro (born 1984) professional cyclist
 Yudai Arashiro (born 1995) professional cyclist
 Yōkō Gushiken (born 1955) boxer
 Rimi Natsukawa (born 1973) folk singer
 Begin (band)  (all members born 1968) pop musical group
 Kaima Taira (born 1999) professional baseball pitcher

Sister cities

In Japan
 Wakkanai, Hokkaido
 Okazaki, Aichi
 Kamiita, Tokushima
 Kitakami, Iwate

Overseas
 Su'ao, Taiwan
 Kauai County, Hawaii, United States

References

External links

 
 

Cities in Okinawa Prefecture
Port settlements in Japan
Populated coastal places in Japan